The Horne Nunataks are a group of six nunataks in relative isolation, located on the north side of Goodenough Glacier, about  inland from the west coast of Palmer Land, Antarctica. They were named by the UK Antarctic Place-Names Committee for Ralph R. Horne, a British Antarctic Survey geologist at the Adelaide and Stonington Island stations in 1964–65.

References

Nunataks of Palmer Land